Salahuddin Owaisi (14 February 1931 – 29 September 2008) was an Indian politician belonging to the All India Majlis-e-Ittehadul Muslimeen party and active in the Telangana region. He served as the Member of Parliament from Hyderabad for six consecutive terms until his retirement in 2004.

Family and background

Owaisi's father was Abdul Wahed Owaisi, who was the president of the All India Majlis-e-Ittehadul Muslimeen till his death. In 1976, Salahuddin Owaisi took over the presidency of the Majlis after his father's death. Owaisi was the father of three sons. His eldest son, Asaduddin Owaisi, succeeded his father as president of the Majlis and has also retained his father's pocket-borough of Hyderabad since 2004 (when Owaisi retired). Owaisi's second son, Akbaruddin Owaisi, is a member of the Telangana Legislative Assembly from the Chandrayangutta Assembly Constituency.

Political career
Salahuddin Owaisi stepped into politics in 1958 at a very early age and was active when his father was jailed in the same year.

Salahuddin Owaisi, also known as "Salar-e-Millat", repeatedly alleged in his speeches that the Indian state had "abandoned" the Muslims to their fate. Therefore, "Muslims should stand on their own feet, rather than look to the State for help", he argued.
Owaisi was considered to be the strongest person in Hyderabad politics as his power extended till the borders of Andhra Pradesh.  Muslims in the State rallied behind him and he was considered to be the man who could tilt the Muslim vote bank in Andhra Pradesh to whichever Party he felt like supporting. He was considered to be the most prominent Muslim Leader in Hyderabad.

Election information
 To work for the economic development and educational advancement of the minorities; Owaisi established minority Engineering College, Medical College, Pharmacy, Degree College and Colleges for hospital management, MBA, MCA and Nursing, a Co-operative Bank, an Industrial Training Institute, and two Hospitals and Urdu Newspaper Etemaad; evinced keen interest in espousing the cause of promotion and protection of Urdu language, literature and culture.

 Won in 1960 Hyderabad Corporation Election from Mallepally
 Won in 1962 Assembly Election for first time from Patthergati constituency
 Won in 1967 Assembly Election from Yakutpura constituency
 Won in 1972 Assembly Election from Pathergatti constituency
 Won in 1978 Assembly Election with 51.98% of votes as an independent in Charminar constituency
 Won in 1983 Assembly Election with 64.05% of votes as an independent in Charminar constituency
 Won in 1984 Parliament Election with 38.13% of votes as an independent Hyderabad constituency
 Won in 1989 Parliament Election with 45.91% of votes for MIM party in Hyderabad constituency
 Won in 1991 Parliament Election with 46.18% of votes for AIMIM party in Hyderabad constituency
 Won in 1996 Parliament Election with 34.57% of votes for AIMIM party in Hyderabad constituency
 Won in 1998 Parliament Election with 44.65% of votes for AIMIM party in Hyderabad constituency
 Won in 1999 Parliament Election with 41.36% of votes for AIMIM party in Hyderabad

Other roles
1985–96—Member, Consultative Committee, Ministry of Home Affairs
1996–97—Member, Committee on Home Affairs
1996–97—Member, Committee on Industry
1996–97—Member, Committee on Finance
1998–99—Member, Committee on Defence

References

External links
 Majlis-e-Ittehadul Muslimeen Official Website

Aligarh Muslim University alumni
Indian Muslims
1936 births
2008 deaths
India MPs 1998–1999
India MPs 1984–1989
India MPs 1989–1991
India MPs 1991–1996
India MPs 1996–1997
Lok Sabha members from Andhra Pradesh
All India Majlis-e-Ittehadul Muslimeen politicians
Politicians from Hyderabad, India
India MPs 1999–2004